A scrivener (or scribe) was a person who could read and write or who wrote letters to court and legal documents. Scriveners were people who made their living by writing or copying written material. This usually indicated secretarial and administrative duties such as dictation and keeping business, judicial, and historical records for kings, nobles, temples, and cities. Scriveners later developed into public servants, accountants, lawyers and petition writers, and in England and Wales, scrivener notaries.

Current role

Scriveners remain common in countries where literacy rates remain low, for example India; they read letters for illiterate customers, as well as write letters or fill out forms for a fee. Many now use portable typewriters to prepare letters for their clients. In areas with very high literacy rates, they are far less common; however, social services organizations, libraries, and the like sometimes offer assistance to service users with low literacy skills to help them fill out forms, draft official correspondence, and the like.

Etymology
The word comes from Middle English , an alteration of obsolete , from Anglo-French , ultimately from Vulgar Latin , itself an alteration of Latin  (scribe).

In literature
A famous work of fiction featuring scriveners is the short story "Bartleby, the Scrivener" by Herman Melville, first published in 1853.

Scrivener notaries
In England and Wales, a scrivener notary is a notary who is fluent in multiple languages.

Scrivener notary tasks generally include authentication and drafting of legal documents for use in international contexts.

Doctrine of "scrivener's error"

The doctrine of a "scrivener's error" is the legal principle that a map-drafting or typographical error in a written contract may be corrected by oral evidence if the evidence is clear, convincing, and precise. If such correction (called scrivener's amendment) affects property rights then it must be approved by those affected by it.

It is a mistake made while copying or transmitting legal documents, as distinguished from a judgment error, which is an error made in the exercise of judgment or discretion, or a technical error, which is an error in interpreting a law, regulation, or principle.
There is a considerable body of case law concerning the proper treatment of a scrivener's error. For example, where the parties to a contract make an oral agreement that, when reduced to a writing, is mis-transcribed, the aggrieved party is entitled to reformation so that the writing corresponds to the oral agreement.

A scrivener's error can be grounds for an appellate court to remand a decision back to the trial court. For example, in Ortiz v. State of Florida, Ortiz had been convicted of possession of less than 20g of marijuana, a misdemeanor. However, Ortiz was mistakenly adjudicated guilty of a felony for the count of marijuana possession. The appellate court held that "we must remand the case to the trial court to correct a scrivener's error."

In some circumstances, courts can also correct scrivener's errors found in primary legislation.

See also

 Administrative scrivener
 Copy typist
 Judicial scrivener
 Legal document assistant
 Notary
 Notary public
 Worshipful Company of Scriveners

References

Obsolete occupations
Writing occupations
Copying